Hans-Peter Pfammatter (1974 in Sierre) is a Swiss jazz pianist and composer.

Pfammatter played as a child at first trumpet. At the age of thirteen, he changed to piano. He played in several rock, pop and jazz bands and studied from 1995 until 1999 at the jazz school of Luzern. then, he played in the recordings of Bänz Oester, Gilbert Paeffgen and Werner Hasler and appeared in the concerts of Corin Curschellas, Ray Anderson, Christy Doran, Fredy Studer, Tony Overwater, Fee Claasen, Brad Dutz and Alexander Sipiagin.

In 2001, he became a member of Christy Doran's group, New Bag. Along with the clarinet player Lucien Dubuis, the bass player Urban Lienert and percussion player Lionel Friedli, he founded the group Scope. The group published the album Nu Gara in 2007.

At the same time, he composed music for dramas and plays such as Tag des Jammers with Peter Schärli and for short movies and radio plays. He composed also for several string quartets.

Discography 
 Bänz Oester Quintet: Max, 1999
 The Wild Bunch: Ghosts, 2001
 New Bag: Heaven Is Black In The Street, 2002
 New Bag: Perspectives, 2004
 Christy Doran, Fritz Hauser, Urs Leimgruber: Fourmi, 2005
 New Bag: Now's The Time, 2005
 Lila: Lila, 2007
 Scope: Nu Gara, 2007

References 

Swiss jazz pianists
Swiss film score composers
1974 births
Living people
People from Valais
21st-century Swiss musicians
21st-century pianists